Gymnognathus is a genus of fungus weevils in the beetle family Anthribidae. There are more than 90 described species in Gymnognathus.

Species
These 96 species belong to the genus Gymnognathus:

 Gymnognathus abundans Jordan, 1906
 Gymnognathus acastus Jordan, 1937
 Gymnognathus acutangulus Jordan, 1895
 Gymnognathus ada Jordan, 1904
 Gymnognathus affinis Jordan, 1895
 Gymnognathus alma Jordan, 1904
 Gymnognathus ampulla Jordan, 1906
 Gymnognathus ancora Schoenherr, 1833
 Gymnognathus aulicus Jordan, 1937
 Gymnognathus barclayi Perger & Guerra, 2016
 Gymnognathus bella Jordan, 1904
 Gymnognathus biloris Jordan, 1937
 Gymnognathus blanca Jordan, 1937
 Gymnognathus bohisi Jordan, 1895
 Gymnognathus brevirostris Jordan, 1895
 Gymnognathus bryanthi Jordan, 1937
 Gymnognathus bryanti Jordan, 1937
 Gymnognathus calus Jordan, 1906
 Gymnognathus chiricahuae Sleeper, 1954
 Gymnognathus cincticollis Jordan, 1895
 Gymnognathus clara Jordan, 1904
 Gymnognathus clathratus Jordan, 1895
 Gymnognathus claudia Jordan, 1906
 Gymnognathus clelia Jordan, 1904
 Gymnognathus compar Jordan, 1895
 Gymnognathus comptus Jordan, 1904
 Gymnognathus cordiger Frieser, 1959
 Gymnognathus coronatus Jordan, 1904
 Gymnognathus daguanus Jordan, 1897
 Gymnognathus decorus Perroud, 1853
 Gymnognathus discoideus Klug
 Gymnognathus doris Jordan, 1937
 Gymnognathus dorsonotatus Fahraeus, 1839
 Gymnognathus editha Jordan, 1904
 Gymnognathus elisa Jordan, 1937
 Gymnognathus emma Jordan, 1904
 Gymnognathus erna Jordan, 1904
 Gymnognathus extensus Jordan, 1904
 Gymnognathus fahraei Fahraeus, 1839
 Gymnognathus femoralis Jordan, 1897
 Gymnognathus flexuosus Jordan, 1895
 Gymnognathus germaini Jordan, 1897
 Gymnognathus hamatus Jordan, 1904
 Gymnognathus hedis Jordan, 1937
 Gymnognathus hedys Jordan, 1937
 Gymnognathus helena Jordan, 1904
 Gymnognathus helma Jordan, 1937
 Gymnognathus hetarus Jordan, 1937
 Gymnognathus hilda Jordan, 1904
 Gymnognathus inca Jordan, 1937
 Gymnognathus indagatus Wolfrum, 1931
 Gymnognathus iphis Jordan, 1937
 Gymnognathus iris Jordan, 1937
 Gymnognathus irma Jordan, 1904
 Gymnognathus leucomelas Jordan, 1904
 Gymnognathus libussa Jordan, 1937
 Gymnognathus lotus Jordan, 1937
 Gymnognathus lusia Jordan, 1937
 Gymnognathus lyrestes Jordan, 1937
 Gymnognathus mariana Jordan, 1904
 Gymnognathus martha Jordan, 1904
 Gymnognathus menetriesi Boheman, 1845
 Gymnognathus mexicanus Jordan, 1906
 Gymnognathus molitor Jordan, 1895
 Gymnognathus mollis Jordan, 1937
 Gymnognathus moranus Jordan, 1937
 Gymnognathus nanus Jordan, 1904
 Gymnognathus nebulosus Motschulsky, 1874
 Gymnognathus nica Jordan, 1937
 Gymnognathus nubilus Jordan, 1904
 Gymnognathus ophiopsis Dalman, 1833
 Gymnognathus ornatus Jordan, 1895
 Gymnognathus pentilus Jordan, 1937
 Gymnognathus phanerus Jordan, 1937
 Gymnognathus pindonis Jordan, 1937
 Gymnognathus polius Jordan, 1906
 Gymnognathus procerus Jordan, 1937
 Gymnognathus pulchellus Jordan, 1937
 Gymnognathus pulcher Jordan, 1906
 Gymnognathus regalis Jordan, 1937
 Gymnognathus robustus Jordan, 1895
 Gymnognathus ruficlava Jordan, 1906
 Gymnognathus scalaris Jordan, 1906
 Gymnognathus scolytinus Jordan, 1904
 Gymnognathus signatus Schoenherr, 1823
 Gymnognathus soror Jordan, 1904
 Gymnognathus stigmenus Wolfrum, 1955
 Gymnognathus talis Jordan, 1937
 Gymnognathus tenuis Jordan, 1895
 Gymnognathus thecla Jordan, 1906
 Gymnognathus triangularis Valentine, 1998
 Gymnognathus uta Wolfrum, 1955
 Gymnognathus vanda Jordan, 1937
 Gymnognathus variicornis Jordan, 1895
 Gymnognathus vicinus Jekel, 1855
 Gymnognathus vitticollis Jordan, 1897

References

Further reading

 
 

Anthribidae
Articles created by Qbugbot